is a railway station in Nakano, Tokyo, Japan, operated by East Japan Railway Company (JR East) and Tokyo Metropolitan Bureau of Transportation (Toei Subway).

Lines
This station is served by the JR East Chūō-Sōbu Line and Toei Ōedo Line. The station number for the Ōedo Line is E-31.

Platforms

JR East
One island platform serving two tracks.

Toei
One island platform serving two tracks.

History
It was renamed Higashi-Nakano in 1917. The Toei station opened on 19 December 1997.

References

External links
 JR East station information 
 Toei station information 

Railway stations in Japan opened in 1906
Toei Ōedo Line
Chūō-Sōbu Line
Stations of Tokyo Metropolitan Bureau of Transportation
Railway stations in Tokyo